Shrimp or prawn dishes are often prepared by frying, especially deep frying. There are several styles.

Popcorn shrimp 

Popcorn shrimp is the name of several small shrimp fritters. Cajun popcorn is a similar dish of peeled crayfish-tail fritters rich of spices, where shrimps could also be used as a substitute for crayfish.

Coconut shrimp 

Crunchy varieties of coconut shrimp dishes are prepared with peeled shrimps dipped in batter, generously coated with grated coconut, and deep-fried.

In the world

Japan 
There are two popular deep-fried prawn dishes in Japan, ebi tempura and ebi furai. The difference is that tempura is never breaded, while breaded deep-fries are called furais. Prawn cookings in Japan typically employ a straightening technique, by making several incisions on its belly side, then bend the prawn backwards to form straight prawns which they consider more appealing.

Ebi tempura 

 or ebiten is tempura of prawn, with a light fluffy coat. It is served as a main dish, with soy-based dipping sauce or salt. It can also be made into other dishes such as:
 Over noodles: tensoba and tempura udon, but dishes with these names not necessarily contain prawns. They may be tempura of other ingredients.
 On a bowl of steamed rice: tendon (tempura donburi). In one version, the tempura is dipped in a sauce before serving. This sauce is considerably thick and sweeter than regular tempura dipping sauce.
 Tenmusu: a rice ball snack (onigiri) topped with a shrimp fritter.

Ebi furai 

 is a breaded and deep-fried prawn dish, of darker and crunchy texture.

Each prawn is prepared by removing the legs and shelling the shells and head, but leaving the tail attached. The gritty tasting digestive tract is removed. The prawn is straightened, then coated with flour, beaten egg and Japanese breadcrumbs panko in that order, and deep-fried in hot cooking oil. Ebi furai is often eaten with a choice of thick Worcester sauce, a squeeze of lemon, or tartare sauce. Traditionally kuruma ebi was used, but many stores have started using cheaper black tiger shrimp. It is thought that ebi furai was created around 1900 along with similar dishes such as tonkatsu in the Western food restaurants of Tokyo.

Ebi furai became a specialty of the city of Nagoya due to a joke made by a popular Japanese tarento (celebrity) Tamori in the 1980s. He mocked Nagoya dialect by theorizing that Nagoyans would call ebi furai as ebi furyaa. Whilst this is false, it made people elsewhere to associate Nagoya with "ebi furyaa". Restaurants in Nagoya took the opportunity by offering inventions such as dishes actually named ebi furyaa, and a visual hybrid with the pride of Nagoya: the Golden shachi.

Other Japanese foods 
 is breaded and deep-fried surimi (paste) of shrimp meat. It differs from ebi furai, which is a whole prawn.

Shrimp kakiage is a kind of tempura, airy, bulky and crunchy, made from a batch of chopped prawns or small whole shrimps, such as sakura shrimp.

Korea 

In Korean cuisine, fried shrimp is known as saeu-twigim. Along with ojingeo-twigim (fried squid) and other twigims, it is a common street food and a bunsikjip (snack bar) item. It is also a common anju (food accompanying alcoholic drinks) for beer.

Philippines 

Fried shrimp dishes in Philippine cuisine include camaron rebosado (battered shrimp), okoy (battered shrimp pancakes), halabos na hipon (fried or boiled shrimp cooked in its own juices or carbonated soda), and nilasing na hipon (battered shrimp marinated in alcohol), among others.

Camaron rebosado is a deep-fried battered shrimp typically served with sweet and sour sauce. It is made by peeling large shrimp and marinating it in a mixture of calamansi juice, salt, and black pepper. It is then coated with a batter made from egg, flour, and corn starch before deep frying.

Okoy is another native Filipino deep-fried dish that typically use small unshelled shrimp. The batter is uniquely traditionally made from galapong (ground soaked glutinous rice), mixed with calabaza, sweet potatoes, or cassava and various vegetables like carrots, onions, and green papaya. It is deep-fried into flat crispy pancakes and traditionally served with a vinegar-based dipping sauce.

See also 
 List of deep fried foods
 List of Philippine dishes
 List of seafood dishes
 List of shrimp dishes

References

External links 
 

Deep fried foods
Japanese cuisine
Philippine cuisine
Shrimp dishes